183rd Street may refer to the following stations of the New York City Subway in the Bronx:

183rd Street (IRT Third Avenue Line); former elevated station of the IRT Third Avenue Line
183rd Street (IRT Jerome Avenue Line); serving the  train
182nd–183rd Streets (IND Concourse Line); serving the  trains